Alloclemensia maculata is a moth of the family Incurvariidae. It is found in Japan on the islands of Hokkaido, Honshu, Shikoku and Kyushu.

The wingspan is 14–16.5 mm for males and 12–16 mm for females. The forewings are dark brown with a violet to reddish bronze lustre and two indistinct yellowish white costal spots.

The larvae feed on Viburnum species, including Viburnum furcatum. They create a depressed orbicular case consisting of two pieces of the same size. Pupation takes place in spring.

References

Moths described in 1981
Incurvariidae
Moths of Japan